Rapti Municipality is a municipality which lies in Eastern part of Chitwan district in Bagmati Province of Nepal. It was formed as municipality in 2015 by merging five existing village development committees, Birendranagar VDC, Bhandara VDC, Piple VDC, Lothar VDC and Korak VDC.
Total area of this municipality is 99.40 (Sq Km) and population of this municipality according to 2068 BS census is 46510.

Prabha Baral and Iman Singh Lama are the first Mayor and Deputy mayor respectively elected by the Local election held in 2017. There are a total of 13 ward in the municipality.

Demographics
At the time of the 2011 Nepal census Rapti Municipality had a population of 59,937. Of these, 61.0% spoke Nepali, 15.4% Chepang, 12.8% Tamang, 6.1% Tharu, 0.9% Gurung, 0.9% Newar, 0.8% Darai, 0.7% Bhojpuri, 0.7% Magar, 0.2% Maithili, 0.1% Danuwar, 0.1% Kham, 0.1% Hindi, 0.1% Rai, and 0.1% other languages as their first language.

In terms of ethnicity/caste, were 22.0% Hill Brahmin, 18.8% Tamang, 17.1% Chepang/Praja, 8.9% Chhetri, 6.1% Tharu, 4.6% Magar, 4.4% Newar, 3.9% Kami, 2.8% Rai, 2.2% Damai/Dholi, 2.1% Gurung, 1.8% Danuwar, 1.1% Sarki, 0.8% Darai, 0.5% Sanyasi/Dasnami, 0.5% Thakuri, 0.3% other Dalit, 0.3% Gharti/Bhujel, 0.3% Musalman, 0.2% Ghale, 0.2% Sunuwar, 0.1% Hajam/Thakur, 0.1% Kalwar, 0.1% Kanu, 0.1% Kathabaniyan, 0.1% Mallaha, 0.1% Teli, 0.1% other Terai and 0.2% others.

In terms of religion, 71.0% were Hindu, 18.0% Buddhist, 7.4% Christian, 3.1% Prakriti, 0.3% Muslim and 0.2% others.

References 

Municipalities in Bagmati Province
Nepal municipalities established in 2015